The 2007 New Year Honours in New Zealand were appointments by Elizabeth II in her right as Queen of New Zealand, on the advice of the New Zealand government, to various orders and honours to reward and highlight good works by New Zealanders, and to celebrate the passing of 2006 and the beginning of 2007. They were announced on 30 December 2006.

The recipients of honours are displayed here as they were styled before their new honour.

Order of New Zealand (ONZ)
Ordinary member
 Dr Vera Doreen Blumhardt  – of Wellington
 Dr Lloyd George Geering   – of Wellington

New Zealand Order of Merit

Distinguished Companion (DCNZM)
 Maurice John Belgrave – of Wellington. For public services, lately as chief ombudsman.
 Margaret Clark  – of Wellington. For services to education.
 The Honourable John Joseph McGrath – of Wellington. For services to the Appeal and Supreme Courts of New Zealand.
 Nigel John Dermot (Sam) Neill  – of Queenstown. For services to acting.
 Tennant Edward (Tay) Wilson  – of Lower Hutt. For services to the Olympic and Commonwealth Games.

Companion (CNZM)
 Colin John Bennet Dale  – of Manukau. For services to local government.
 Barrie Patrick Everard – of Auckland. For services to the film industry.
 Howard Edward Fancy – of Wellington. For public services, lately as Secretary of Education.
 Ian Ferguson Farrant – of Wānaka. For services to business and the community.
 Graham Fortune – of Wellington. For public services, lately as Secretary of Defence.
 Emeritus Professor Graeme Stuart Fraser – of Palmerston North. For services to education and the community.
 Basil Manderson Logan – of Upper Hutt. For services to business and government.
 Distinguished Professor David Anthony Dougall Parry – of Palmerston North. For services to biophysics.
 Mary Anne Schnackenberg – of Auckland. For services to people with visual impairments.
 Professor Anne Briar Smith – of Dunedin. For services to children.
 James Robert Sutton – of Wainuiomata. For public services as a member of Parliament and minister of the Crown.
 Gordon Frederick Tietjens  – of Tauranga. For services to rugby.
 Edward Richard Woods – of Wellington. For public services, lately as director of the New Zealand Security Intelligence Service.

Officer (ONZM)
 Professor Robert Donald Anderson – of Palmerston North. For services to science, education and cricket.
 Peter Gregg Arnett – of McLean, Virginia, United States of America. For services to journalism.
 Venkataraman Balakrishnan – of Wellington. For services to medicine.
 Sister Winefride Marie Blake  – of Wellington. For services to music education.
 Chung Yock (Dan) Chan  – of Wellington. For services to the Chinese community.
 David Peter Clews – of Hamilton. For services to orthopaedics and the community.
 Leslie William Curtin – of North Shore. For services to marine fisheries.
 Frank Morris Endacott – of Kaiapoi. For services to rugby league.
 Professor Emeritus Roger Curtis Green – of Waitakere. For services to New Zealand history.
 Claire Elizabeth Hague – of Napier. For services to education.
 Antony Brian Hambrook – of Auckland. For services to the marine industry.
 Paul Moore Hargreaves – of Auckland. For services to business and the community.
 Jennifer Susan May – of Christchurch. For services to heritage conservation.
 Dr Robert Miller – of Dunedin. For services to schizophrenia research.
 Dr Farah Rangikoepa Palmer – of Palmerston North. For services to women's rugby and sport.
 Jeremy David Pope – of Wellington. For services to international affairs.
 Anthony George Popplewell – of North Shore. For services to rowing and sports administration.
 Professor Ivan Leon Reilly – of Auckland. For services to mathematics.
 Dr Satendra Kumar Singh  – of Auckland. For services to the Indian community.
 Robert John Stewart – of Christchurch. For services to manufacturing and the community.
 Vincent Ward – of Auckland. For services to film.
 Jennifer Cecily Ward-Lealand – of Auckland. For services to the theatre and the community.
 Brigadier Mark Wheeler – Brigadiers' List, New Zealand Army
 Carol Kate Guiniven White – of Auckland. For services to education.

Additional
Lieutenant Commander Wayne Bruce Burtton – Royal New Zealand Navy. For military operational service.

Member (MNZM)
 Dr Jack Stanford Allan – of Hamilton. For services to education.
 David Roger Bates – of Tūrangi. For services to search and rescue.
 Alistair Oliphant Beckett – of Wellington; superintendent, New Zealand Police. For services to the New Zealand Police.
 Dr Patrick Jerome Beehan – of Hamilton. For services to plastic surgery and the community.
 Major Gordon William Benfell – Royal New Zealand Infantry Regiment.
 James Bennett  – of Hamilton. For services to education.
 William Wakefield Bishop – of North Shore; detective superintendent, New Zealand Police. For services to the New Zealand Police.
 Janice Mary Bowman – of Auckland. For services to the community.
 Lieutenant Commander Barbara Elizabeth Cassin – Royal New Zealand Navy.
 Raewyn Phoebe Clark  – of Manukau. For services to the community.
 Gerald Lynn Te Kapa Coates – of Wellington. For services to engineering.
 Nicolette Mary Darlow  – of Wellington. For services to the community.
 Tenick Carr Dennison – of Masterton. For services to conservation.
 Heather Joyce Dodunski  – of New Plymouth. For services to dairy farming and the community.
 Andrew Raymond Drummond – of Christchurch. For services to sculpture.
 Warwick Francis Duell – of Christchurch. For services to the Department of Corrections.
Gaynor Mary Eaton – of Dunedin. For services to embroidery.
 Dr Denis Hugo Friedlander – of Hamilton. For services to medicine.
 Robert Henry Glading  – of North Shore. For services to golf.
 Peter Harold Goodman – of Motueka. For services to business and the community.
 Sandra Greig – of Christchurch. For services to ballet and dance.
 Colin James Hammond  – of Whakatāne. For services to the community.
 Marion Ann Hancock – of Auckland. For services to peace education.
 Bryan Hector Heron – of Waitakere. For services to the community.
 Dr Elsie Seckyee Ho – of Hamilton. For services to the migrant community.
 Peter Edward Kerridge  – of Greymouth. For services to rugby league and the community.
 William Thomas Leathwick – of Manukau. For services to broadcasting, television and the community.
 Ali'itasi Pepe Lemalu  – of Dunedin. For services to the Pacific Islands community.
 Malcolm David MacKenzie – of Winton. For services to conservation.
 Keith Stuart Mann – of Christchurch. For services to sport, in particular fencing.
 Jocelyn Mary Marshall  – of Hamilton. For services to the community.
 Mervyn Charles Martin  – of New Plymouth. For services to the community.
 Katie Isabel Morgan – of Napier. For services to conservation.
 Suzanne Ngaire Muirhead – of Wellington. For services to women's hockey.
 Barbara Graham Cargill Murison – of Wellington. For services to children's literature.
 Sheila Ellen Natusch – of Wellington. For services as a writer and illustrator.
 Tamati Maungarangi Paraone – of Kawakawa. For services to Māori.
 Dr Dennis Louis Pezaro – of Wānaka. For services to community health.
 Dr Chula Niranjan Ajasath Rajapakse – of Lower Hutt. For services to rheumatology and the Sri Lankan community.
 Adrian Charles Riegen – of Waitakere. For services to conservation.
 Associate Professor Peter Larry Schwartz – of Dunedin. For services to medical education.
 Harris Heremaia Shortland  – of Porirua. For services to the Department of Corrections.
 Simon James Towns – of London, United Kingdom. For services to hockey.
 William John Townsend  – of Naseby. For services to rugby and the community.
 Lieutenant Colonel Darryl James Tracy – Royal New Zealand Infantry Regiment.
 Miniata Te Rito Westrupp – of Gisborne. For services to te reo Māori and the community.
 Dr Allan Neil White  – of Tauranga. For services to medicine and the community.
 Commander Mathew Charles Williams – Royal New Zealand Navy.
 Simon John Williamson – of North Shore. For services to the New Zealand Customs Service.
 Juliet Mai Yates – of Auckland. For services to local-body affairs and the community.

Additional
 Captain Neville Douglas Mosley – Corps of Royal New Zealand Engineers. For military operational service.
 Acting Captain Mark August Sydney – Corps of Royal New Zealand Military Police. For military operational service.

Honorary
 Frederick Shaw Benson III – of Alexandria, Virginia, United States of America. For services to New Zealand–United States relations.
 Hiroshi Ohashi – of Hyōgo, Japan. For services to education.
 Jorge Artemio Sandoval-Medina – of Lower Hutt. For services to cycling.

Companion of the Queen's Service Order (QSO)

For community service
 William Bernard Boyd – of Manukau
 Gavin John Anthony Kerr  – of Blenheim
 Constance Joy Owens – of Mt Maunganui
 David John Russell – of Wellington
 Robin Lindsey Shepherd – of Kaitaia

For public services
 Salvatore Vincent Gargiulo – of Nelson
 Dr Margaret Edith Catherine Honeyman – of North Shore
 Rae Scott Julian – of Wellington
 Alison Margaret McAlpine  – of Nelson
 Laurence Jeremy Elder Salmond – of North Shore
 The Honourable William Robson Storey – of Huntly
 Dr Gillian Joy Tasker – of Wellington
 Dr Michael Eric Upcott Taylor – of Waikanae

Queen's Service Medal (QSM)

For community service
 Philip Andrews – of Rotorua
 Elizabeth Margaret Bayliss – of Whakatāne
 Thomas Frank Bayliss – of Whakatāne
 William David Blake – of Nūhaka
 Linda Blincko – of North Shore
 Mary Christine Burdon – of Rotorua
 Benjamin de Thierry – of Wellsford
 Edna Vivian Mary Downey – of Palmerston North
 Roy Gardiner – of Hastings
 Tautini Moana Glover – of Gisborne
 John Stewart Grace – of Lower Hutt
 Daniel Joseph Harris – of Ōkaihau
 Seyed Hassan Hosseini  – of Waitakere
 Eileen Margaret Langridge – of Christchurch
 Ngov Dun Meng Ly – of Manukau
 Robert Frederick Lynn – of Ashburton
 Geraldine Clare Madden – of Masterton
 Taulapapa Moemoeolemalotumua Mata'afa Faumuina Mulitalo – of Manukau
 Christina Mary, Lady McCombs – of Christchurch
 Dr Paula Marjorie McKellar – of New Plymouth
 Brian Dempster Mellar – of Thames
 Francis Victor Morine  – of New Plymouth
 Marlene Nora Mulholland – of Wellington
 Narayana Sankaran Nair – of Auckland
 Haerenga Noa Nicholson – of Dannevirke
 Sinahemotutama Utalo Panama – of Manukau
 Zeta Marie Reilly – of Tākaka
 Jean Euphemia Finlayson (Jinty) Rorke – of Tauranga
 Jessie Petrova Seaman – of Raetihi
 Annette Mary Skeen – of Taupō
 Marie Alice Stothart – of Hastings
 Michael Joseph Tahere – of Kapiti. Senior constable, New Zealand Police.
 Dr Nyunt Naing Thein – of Auckland
 Jennie Beverley Thomas – of Whangamatā
 Elizabeth Tierney – of Taihape
 Captain Keith Alfred James Tremain  – Salvation Army (Retired), of Hastings
 Leslie Philip Walden – of Feilding
 Leah Leslie Watson – of Kerikeri
 Graham Charles Watton  – of Paeroa
 Dr Owen Ralph Wiles – of Tokoroa
 Margaret Florence Mina Wilson – of Mosgiel
 George Wong – of Dunedin

For public services
 Patricia Eleanor Beck – of Greymouth
 Alan Frederick Bines – of Rotorua
 Jennifer Elizabeth Brain – of Whangārei
 Raymond Barry Clarke – of Waitakere
 Alan James Clearwater – of Palmerston. Lately chief fire officer, Palmerston Volunteer Fire Brigade.
 Douglas John Cowan – of Kaiapoi
 Preston Bryce Craig  – of Ōpōtiki
 Mark Gregory Davidson – of Paraparaumu Beach. Senior Sergeant, New Zealand Police.
 Yvonne Duncan – of North Shore
 Helen Catherine Gatonyi – of Christchurch
 James Edward John Guyton – of Mossburn. Chief fire officer, Mossburn Volunteer Fire Brigade.
 Barry Alexander Hartley – of New Plymouth
 Dr Susan Jennifer Jarvis – of Christchurch
 Glenys Keys – of Manukau
 Averil Ada Langrell – of Geraldine
 Gail Elizabeth Loane – of Ngarimu Bay
 Mary Bernadette Te-Vaine Tura Manumea – of Auckland
 Lyvia Marama Marsden – of North Shore
 Vivienne Anne Marshall – of Christchurch
 David John McFarlane – of Renwick. Chief fire officer, Renwick Fire District.
 Ronald Charles Noice – of Cambridge
 Philip Gary Palfrey – of Manukau
 Kenneth Fredrick Parker – of Manukau. Chief fire officer, Bucklands Volunteer Fire Brigade.
 Malcolm John Pearson – of Wellington
 Professor Peter Douglas Kenneth Ramsay – of Hamilton
 Kevin Michael Reilly – of Palmerston North
 Shona Margaret Robb  – of Lower Hutt
 Margaret Alice Robson – of Christchurch
 Peter Rushworth – of Auckland
 Cameron Brant Shaw – of Taumarunui. Detective sergeant, New Zealand Police.
 Elaine Simons – of Manukau
 Eru Mahia Smith – of Te Karaka
 Nora Van der Schrieck – of Papakura
 Karen Margaret Vaughan – of Wellington. Senior constable, New Zealand Police.
 David Graeme Walker – of Waitakere. Inspector, New Zealand Police.
 Raymond Frederick Walker – of Woodville. Lately chief fire officer, Woodville Volunteer Fire Brigade.
 Ronald Lancelot Walker – of Invercargill
 Ellen Nan Watts – of Christchurch

Honorary
 Theresia Magdalena Elisabeth van Ree – of Lower Hutt
 Willem van Ree – of Lower Hutt

New Zealand Antarctic Medal (NZAM)
 Professor John Dudley Bradshaw – of Christchurch. For services to Antarctic science.
 Dr Clive Howard-Williams – of Christchurch. For services to Antarctic science.

Honorary
 Dr Karl Erb – of Kensington, Maryland, United States of America. For services to New Zealand Antarctic programmes.

References

New Year Honours
2007 awards
2007 in New Zealand
New Zealand awards